William Skitch (31 August 1860 – 13 July 1944) was a New Zealand cricketer. He played two first-class matches for Otago in 1883/84.

See also
 List of Otago representative cricketers

References

External links
 

1860 births
1944 deaths
New Zealand cricketers
Otago cricketers
Sportspeople from Bendigo